In Greek mythology, Agapenor (gen. Ἀγαπήνορος means 'much distress') was a leader of the Arcadians in the Trojan war.

Family 
Agapenor was a son of Ancaeus, and grandson of Lycurgus.

Mythology 
As king of the Arcadians, Agapenor received sixty ships from Agamemnon, in which he led his Arcadians to Troy.  He also occurs among the suitors of Helen and one of the men to be in the Trojan Horse.

On Agapenor's return from Troy he was cast by a storm on the coast of Cyprus, where he founded the town of Paphos and in it the famous temple of Aphrodite.  He also occurs in the story of Alcmaeon: it was to him that Arsinoe (Alphesiboea), Alcmaeon's wife was sold away by her own brothers.

Agapenor had a descendant Laodice, who was known for having sent to Tegea a robe (peplos) as a gift to Athena Alea, and to have built a temple of Aphrodite Paphia in Tegea.

Notes

References 

 Apollodorus, The Library with an English Translation by Sir James George Frazer, F.B.A., F.R.S. in 2 Volumes, Cambridge, MA, Harvard University Press; London, William Heinemann Ltd. 1921. . Online version at the Perseus Digital Library. Greek text available from the same website.
Graves, Robert, The Greek Myths, Harmondsworth, London, England, Penguin Books, 1960. 
Graves, Robert, The Greek Myths: The Complete and Definitive Edition. Penguin Books Limited. 2017. 
Homer, The Iliad with an English Translation by A.T. Murray, Ph.D. in two volumes. Cambridge, MA., Harvard University Press; London, William Heinemann, Ltd. 1924. Online version at the Perseus Digital Library.
 Homer, Homeri Opera in five volumes. Oxford, Oxford University Press. 1920. Greek text available at the Perseus Digital Library.
 Hyginus, Fabulae from The Myths of Hyginus translated and edited by Mary Grant. University of Kansas Publications in Humanistic Studies. Online version at the Topos Text Project.
 Pausanias, Description of Greece with an English Translation by W.H.S. Jones, Litt.D., and H.A. Ormerod, M.A., in 4 Volumes. Cambridge, MA, Harvard University Press; London, William Heinemann Ltd. 1918. . Online version at the Perseus Digital Library
Pausanias, Graeciae Descriptio. 3 vols. Leipzig, Teubner. 1903.  Greek text available at the Perseus Digital Library.

Achaean Leaders
Achaeans (Homer)
Suitors of Helen
Princesses in Greek mythology
Ancient Cypriots
Arcadocypriot Greek

Arcadian mythology